The 1989-90 season was tumultuous for BFC Dynamo. The East German regime faltered and parts of the Berlin Wall were opened on 9 November 1989. Forward Andreas Thom became the first player in the DDR-Oberliga to leave for the West German Bundesliga. The dismantling of the champion team from the 1980s was now well underway. The Stasi was dissolved and the club thus lost a major sponsor. The East German Ministry of the Interior declared that it was only prepared to support the club until the end of the 1989-90 season. The club changed its name to FC Berlin on 19 February 1990, in an attempt to distance the club from the Stasi. The number of spectators dropped drastically. FC Berlin finished the 1989-90 DDR-Oberliga in fourth place and failed for the first time to qualify for a European competition. Also Thomas Doll, Frank Rohde and Rainer Ernst left for the Bundesliga after the season.

FC Berlin got off to a poor start in the 1990-91 NOFV-Oberliga, and Jürgen Bogs returned as coach. FC Berlin fans created one of the biggest hooligan scenes in East Germany, and an 18-year-old supporter, Mike Polley, was shot dead by police during riots in Leutzsch in connection with a match against FC Sachsen Leipzig on 3 November 1990. The team finished the 1990-91 NOFV-Oberliga in eleventh place, but qualified for the play-off for the 2. Bundesliga. FC Berlin narrowly missed promotion to the 2. Bundesliga. A large number of players left the club after the season, including Heiko Bonan, Burkhard Reich, Waldemar Ksienzyk, and Hendrik Herzog. FC Berlin participated for the first time in the DFB-Pokal in the 1991-92 season. The team dominated the 1991-92 NOFV-Oberliga, but would once again fail to qualify to the 2. Bundesliga. More players left the team, including Christian Backs and Jörn Lenz. FC Berlin would lose two complete teams during the first one or two years after the fall of the Berlin Wall.

FC Berlin had to continue at the amateur level. The competitors in the league now consisted of teams such as Tennis Borussia Berlin, Eisenhüttenstädter FC Stahl, and BSV Stahl Brandenburg. FC Berlin had to rely on its youth department to supply the team with new players. The club qualified for the 1994–95 Regionalliga Nordost. The re-instated Regionalliga now constituted the new third level. The Regionalliga Nordost meant new meetings with well known opponents such as 1. FC Union Berlin and FC Carl Zeiss Jena. FC Berlin struggled in the Regionalliga Nordost, but managed to retain it place in the league. The 1995–96 Regionalliga Nordost would also mean meetings with the old rival 1. FC Dynamo Dresden. Werner Voigt became the new coach at the end of autumn 1996. He had a long history with BFC Dynamo.

The millions the club had earned on player transfers in the early 1990s had been used up by the mid-1990s. Club President Volkmar Wanski had to support the club with annual personal contributions. The successes in the Regionalliga Nordost did not materialize, and Voigt and FC Berlin eventually agreed to part ways. Central players in the team during 1998-99 season were Heiko Brestrich, Jörn Lenz, Mario Maek, Mario Kallnik, Davor Krznarić and Timo Lesch. The club decided to take back its old club name of BFC Dynamo at the general meeting on 8 May 1999. BFC Dynamo then won the 1998-99 Berlin Cup and thus captured its first Berlin Cup title.

BFC Dynamo continued to have financial difficulties, as it did not have enough sponsors. The number of spectators was also low and new sponsors were deterred by hooliganism. Jürgen Bogs returned for his third stint as coach at the end of 1999. The club finally got a promising main sponsor in the form of software company Lipro AG in early 2000. However, the difficulties in the league continued and the club's liabilities started to become significant. BFC Dynamo finished the 1999–2000 Regonalliga Nordost in 17th place and was relegated to the NOFV-Oberliga Nord. The club made an attempt to win promotion back to the Regionalliga Nord. BFC Dynamo dominated the 2000–01 NOFV-Oberliga Nord. The team had lost only three matches during the league season, and striker Denis Kozlov had scored a whopping 29 goals in the league. BFC Dynamo would face 1. FC Magdeburg of the NOFV-Oberliga Süd in the play-off for the Regionalliga Nord. However, it was clear even before the first meeting that the club had major financial problems. BFC Dynamo lost the play-off and the club's total debts were now estimated at several millions of Deutsche Mark.

The insurance company AOK applied for insolvency against BFC Dynamo on 21 June 2001, and the club was thrown into a financial crisis. Supporters started a fundraiser and organized a demonstration to save the club. Also, former players from the 1980s, such as Hans-Jürgen Riediger and Rainer Troppa, intended to participate in the demonstration. Insolvency proceedings were opened on 1 November 2001. The club was thus automatically relegated to Verandsliga Berlin. The total debts were estimated at up to 7 millions Deutsche Mark. The entire presidium resigned and an emergency board was appointed. Two of the members of the emergency board were André Sommer and Rayk Bernt. Sommer and Bernt were longtime supporters, but controversial due to their connection to the Hells Angels.

The Sommer and Bernt presidium was eventually overthrown by supporters and the former coach of the women's team Volkmar Lucius, after an application to the Charlottenburg District Court. Entrepreneur Mike Peters became club president on 31 May 2002. The preferential claims seemed insurmountable, but supporters had received several waivers from creditors and had also collected thousands of Euro. The new presidium around Peters made a major financial contribution to the insolvency plan. Peters would also finance a large part of the budget for the 2002-03 Verbandsliga Berlin. The team finished its first season in the Verbandsliga Berlin in third place. BFC Dynamo then finished the 2003-04 Verbandsliga Berlin in first place and finally won promotion back to the NOFV-Oberliga Nord. The team had won all 17 matches in the second half of the season, which was a new record in the Verbandsliga Berlin. The insolvency proceedings finally came to a positive conclusion and were closed on 16 June 2004.

FC Berlin and decline (1989–2001)

The Peaceful Revolution (1989–1990)

Frank Pastor was transferred to BSG Aktivist Schwarze Pumpe at the beginning of the tumultuous 1989–90 season. On 1 September 1989, the third matchday, BFC Dynamo defeated 1. FC Magdeburg 2-1 in front of 11,500 spectators at the Friedrich-Ludwig-Jahn-Sportpark. Heiko Bonan and Andreas Thom scored one goal each. As winners of the 1988–89 FDGB-Pokal, BFC Dynamo qualified for the 1989-90 UEFA Cup Winners' Cup. The team defeated Valur in the first round, but was eliminated by AS Monaco on the away goal rule in the second round. Coach Helmut Jäschke decided to place young goalkeeper Oskar Kosche in the upcoming match against HFC Chemie in the 1989-90 FDGB-Pokal on 4 November 1989. The club's long-time goalkeeper Bodo Rudwaleit then suddenly announced his immediate retirement from football.

At the time, the East German regime faltered under pressure from events in neighbouring countries, with thousands of East Germans leaving or applying to leave the country, and political mass demonstrations being held. Erich Honecker was forced to resign on 18 October 1989 and parts of the Berlin Wall were opened on 9 November 1989. People in East Berlin could now travel freely to West Berlin. The Stasi was transformed into the Office for National Security (AfNS) on 17 November 1989. The transformation also ended the tenure of Erich Mielke as Minister of State Security. Mielke would soon be dismissed as the First Chairman of SV Dynamo as well.

Bayer Leverkusen manager Reiner Calmund saw the opportunity to recruit top players in East Germany as soon as the Berlin Wall opened. In connection with the match between East Germany and Austria in Vienna during the qualifiers for the 1990 FIFA World Cup on 15 November 1989, Calmund managed to obtain the contact details of Andreas Thom. He immediately contacted Thom in East Berlin and eventually convinced him to join Bayer Leverkusen. Calmund further reached an agreement with East German officials on a transfer. Coach Jäschke was not consulted about the transfer and was presented with a fait accompli. The transfer was officially announced on 12 December 1989, making Thom the first player in the Oberliga to be transferred to the Bundesliga. The transfer fee amounted to 2.5 million Deutsche Mark. Sources in West Germany speculated that the German Football Association of the GDR (DFV) would receive 15 percent of the sum. Club President Herbert Krafft announced that a larger sum would also be made available to the Ministry of Health, to be used to promote the sport to the next generation.

BFC Dynamo played to a 0–0 draw in an away game against BSG Wismut Aue on the 13th matchday, on 1 December 1989. The match would be the last league match of Andreas Thom at BFC Dynamo. 
The team finished the first half of the season in fourth place. BFC Dynamo was then eliminated in the quarter-finals of the 1989-90 FDGB-Pokal after losing 0–2 to FC Vorwärts Frankfurt at the Stadion der Freundschaft on 9 December 1989. The dismantling of the championship team of the 1980s was now underway. Bodo Rudwaleit had reversed his decision to retire from football, wishing instead to be transferred to BSG Stahl Eisenhüttenstadt. Rainer Ernst began negotiations with Borussia Dortmund, but they were eventually stopped by Club President Krafft, who claimed that Ernst was not in good enough shape for a transfer. The club was also contacted by MSV Duisburg, who wanted to get Marco Köller out of his contract with BFC Dynamo. Bodo Rudwaleit was then transferred to BSG Stahl Eisenhüttenstadt on 1 January 1990. Long-time forward and midfielder Bernd Schulz was in turn transferred to BSG Bergmann-Borsig.

The AfNS was completely dissolved on 13 January 1990 after further attempts at reorganization. The dissolution of the Stasi meant that BFC Dynamo lost a major sponsor. Only the less generous Ministry of the Interior and the Customs Administration remained from the previous sponsor troika. The club still had an extensive organization, including 14 coaches and 30 full-time employees; and it would now have to look for new sources of income. Krafft had recommended himself for the office, as the head of a military unit within the Volkspolizei. His football knowledge was limited, and he was now torn between the fear of losing his job and the realization that he probably did not have the managerial skills required to market BFC Dynamo in the capitalist West. Krafft and manager Jürgen Bogs travelled to Bremen for a crash course in the free-market economy with Werder Bremen Manager Willi Lemke.

FC Berlin (1990)
Coach Jäschke was dismissed during the 1989–1990 winter break and was replaced by Peter Rohde. Rohde had played 159 league, and 14 international, matches for BFC Dynamo between 1969 and 1978 and was an older brother of team captain Frank Rohde. He had been a youth coach in the club since 1984 and had previously been the coach of the BFC Dynamo team in the Next Generation Oberliga (de). The East German Ministry of the Interior announced that it was only prepared to support the club financially until the end of the 1989–90 season. The fate of the club was uncertain, and the sports management in East Germany considered dissolving the club. Another option that was allegedly considered was a merger with local rival Union Berlin. The club was under a lot of pressure, due to its former proximity to the Stasi. BFC Dynamo fought for its existence, and club management planned to launch a concept for its preservation before the end of the 1989–90 season. Abandoning the name "Dynamo" and a civil restructuring of the club was predicted to be part of such a concept. BFC Dynamo was eventually rebranded as FC Berlin on 19 February 1990 in an attempt to distance the club from the Stasi. The name change was made after a meeting between players, coaches, parents, and supporters. Other names that had allegedly been considered were "FC Allemannia", "FC Olympia" or "FC Fortuna Berlin", as well as "Grün-Gelb Berlin" for the colours of the Peaceful revolution.  Krafft was dismissed at the same time. He was replaced by Bogs as acting president. New club elections were planned to be held as soon as possible in May 1990.

BFC Dynamo played friendly matches against West German teams during the winter break. The team lost 0–2 to Werder Bremen at the Sportplatz Kampfbahn in Rühen on 10 February 1990, and then 0–4 to Borussia Dortmund at the Kampfbahn Schwansbell in Lünen on 17 February 1990. The club then participated in the first edition of the indoor tournament "Internationales Berliner Hallenfußballturnier" in the Werner-Seelenbinder-Halle on 18–20 February 1990, together with Union Berlin, Hertha, Blau-Weiß 1890 Berlin, Pogoń Szczecin, and Bohemians 1905, among other clubs. Legendary Hamburger SV striker Uwe Seeler was guest of honour at the tournament. The team was met by a fiercely hostile audience, and the players were insulted and spat at. Demonstrators had stormed the Stasi headquarters in the locality of Lichtenberg only days before the tournament. Many spectators in the audience shouted "Stasi pigs!". FC Berlin reached the final, but lost 4–5 in extra time against Union Berlin in front of 4,400 spectators. Thomas Doll scored a total of 12 goals and became the best scorer in the tournament. The tournament marked the beginning of the demise of the former East German champion. The Peaceful revolution and the hatred against the club made many players want to leave as soon as possible and distance themselves.

Coach Peter Rohde had a hard time finding a replacement for Thom. He was also worried that he would soon lose Doll as well. FC Berlin defeated FC Rot-Weiß Erfurt 3-1 away on the 14th matchday, 24 February 1990. Doll scored two goals in the match. The team then defeated BSG Stahl Brandenburg 5-1 at home on the following matchday, 3 March 1990. FC Berlin was now in third place in the league, only two points behind leading SG Dynamo Dresden. However, there followed a 1-3 defeat away to second-placed 1. FC Magdeburg on the 16th matchday, 10 March 1990, and a 1-1 draw against BSG Energie Cottbus on the 17th matchday, 17 March 1990. It now became quite clear that FC Berlin would not have a chance at the title. Hooligans of FC Berlin rioted in Jena before the match against FC Carl Zeiss Jena on the 20th matchday, 4 April 1990. They looted shops, smashed windscreens of police vehicles with stones, and left a trail of destruction in the city centre.

Frank Rohde signed with Hamburger SV, which had been looking for a replacement for the injured Dietmar Jakobs. Doll received many offers and initially began negotiations with Borussia Dortmund. However, Seeler was a fan of Doll. Frank Rohde told his contacts at Hamburger SV that Doll was interested, and soon Doll also signed with Hamburger SV. The transfer fee for Doll amounted to 2.3 million Deutsche Mark. The team lost 1-3 at home to 1. FC Lokomotive Leipzig on the 24th matchday, 8 May 1990. Just 1,400 spectators came to the Friedrich-Ludwig-Jahn-Sportpark for the match. FC Berlin eventually finished the 1989–90 Oberliga in fourth place and failed for the first time in a long time to qualify for a European tournament. The average attendance fell sharply in 1990. From 7,271 in the autumn of 1989 it fell to only 3,383 in the spring of 1990. The team lost Doll and Rohde to Hamburger SV and Rainer Ernst to 1. FC Kaiserslautern after the season.

Failed promotion (1990–1994)
FC Berlin participated in the 1990 Intertoto Cup during the summer of 1990 and was placed in the same group as FC Bayer 05 Uerdingen, NK Olimpija Ljubljana, and Grasshopper Club Zürich. The home matches were played at the Stadion im Sportforum. Having sold off almost all of its offensive players during the 1989–90 season, the team won two matches and finished in third place. The club recruited striker Mikhail Pronichev, from FC Lokomotiv Moscow, and midfielder Dirk Rehbein, from SC Fortuna Köln, and goalkeeper Iliya Valov, from Lokomotiv Sofia, for the 1990–91 season. Pronichev was one of the first players from the Soviet Union to play in Germany, and Rehbein was the first player from West Germany to join the team. Heiko Bonan, Burkhard Reich, Waldemar Ksienzyk, Thorsten Boer, Eike Küttner, Jörg Fügner, Jörn Lenz, Hendrik Herzog, Dirk Rehbein and Christian Backs were among the key players. FC Berlin started the 1990-91 DDR-Oberliga season with four consecutive defeats: 0–4 away to FC Rot-Weiß Erfurt on the opening matchday; 1–2 at home to FC Energie Cottbus on the second; 1–4 away to 1. FC Dynamo Dresden on the third; and 0–3 home to F.C. Hansa Rostock on the fourth, after which the team was in last place in the league. Coach Peter Rohde was dismissed and Jürgen Bogs, who now held the position as managing director, returned as coach. Dr. Dieter Fuchs (de) became the new managing director of the club. He had a long background in BFC Dynamo and had also been a manager at the DFV. However, the fact that Dr. Fuchs took over a function at FC Berlin was considered somewhat surprising. The club sought to distance itself from its East German past. Despite this, it was bringing back Dr. Fuchs.

FC Berlin played 1. FC Magdeburg away on the fifth matchday, 15 September 1990. It was the first match since the return of Bogs as coach and ended in a 3–3 draw. FC Berlin had won its first point in the league. Eike Küttner, Burkhard Reich, and Christian Backs scored one goal each in the match. FC Berlin met Union Berlin in the second round of the 1990-91 FDGB-Pokal at Stadion an der Alten Försterei on 21 September 1990. The score was 1–1 at full-time. FC Berlin eventually lost 1-2 after a late goal by former BFC Dynamo player Olaf Seier in extra-time and was eliminated from the competition. FC Berlin then finally captured its first win of the league season, against 1. FC Lokomotive Leipzig at the Stadion im Sportforum, on the sixth matchday, 28 September 1990. FC Berlin lost 0-1 at home to FC Carl Zeiss Jena on the eighth matchday, 13 October 1990. The match drew only 1,012 spectators. 200 police officers were deployed to the match, despite the low attendance. Club President Dr. Klaus Janz resigned, and Dr. Wolfgang Hösrich became the new president on 15 October 1990. Dr. Hösrich had a background as a club doctor for SC Dynamo Berlin and BFC Dynamo. FC Berlin was in last place in the league during almost the entire first half of the season. The team defeated FC Vorwärts Frankfurt 2–1 at the Friedrich-Ludwig-Jahn-Sportpark in the last match before the winter break. FC Berlin thereby surpassed FC Sachsen Leipzig on goal difference and finished the first half of the season in 13th place. Dirk Anders left for 1. FC Lokomotive Leipzig during the winter break. The team attended a training camp in Malaysia at the end of January 1991.

A wave of hooliganism swept across East Germany in 1990. A total of 230,000 young people in East Germany had been dismissed from their apprenticeships. One of the largest hooligan scenes in Germany was formed around FC Berlin. The situation peaked during the match between FC Berlin and FC Sachsen Leipzig on the 10th matchday, 3 November 1990. Hundreds of supporters of FC Berlin had travelled to the match. Riots broke out near the Georg-Schwarz-Sportpark and an 18-year-old supporter of FC Berlin, Mike Polley, was shot dead by the police. The police had fired between 50 and 100 shots in about a minute. Riots then continued in central Leipzig with great devastation. The friendly match between East Germany and West Germany that was planned to be held on the Zentralstadion in Leipzig on 21 November 1990 was cancelled following the events. Riots would also break out in connection with the match between F.C. Hansa Rostock and FC Berlin on the 17th matchday, 16 March 1991. A group of 500–600 supporters of FC Berlin travelled on a special train to Rostock for the match. Hooligans of FC Berlin smashed shop windows and attacked people in central Rostock. Fighting with supporters of F.C. Hansa Rostock broke out around the Ostseestadion. The devastation would once again be extensive and two police officers were injured in clashes. The hooligans of FC Berlin came to shape the entire 1990–91 season.

FC Berlin recruited Icelandic striker Tómas Ingi Tómasson from ÍBV for the second half of the 1990–91 season. The team won 2–1 at home against Chemnitzer FC and then 2–1 away against FC Victoria 91 Frankfurt in the last two matches of the league season. FC Berlin eventually finished the 1990-91 NOFV-Oberliga in 11th place and qualified for the play-off for the 2. Bundesliga. FC Berlin was placed in the same group as Union Berlin, 1. FC Magdeburg, and BSV Stahl Brandenburg. The team defeated BSV Stahl Brandenburg 3–0 at home in the opening round on 5 June 1991. Then followed a 0–1 defeat away against 1. FC Union Berlin, a 0–0 draw at home against 1. FC Magdeburg, and a 0–0 draw away against BSV Stahl Brandenburg. FC Berlin then defeated Union Berlin 2–0 in the fifth round in front of 9,475 spectators at the Fredrich-Ludwig-Jahn-Stadion on 18 June 1991. Heiko Bonan scored the first, and Thorsten Boer the second, goal for FC Berlin. FC Berlin was in second place before the sixth and final round of the play-offs. The team was just one point behind leading BSV Stahl Brandenburg. It managed to win 3–5 away against Magdeburg in the final round. Tómas Ingi Tómasson scored two goals in the match. However, BSV Stahl Brandenburg won 2–0 away against Union Berlin. FC Berlin thus finished in second place and had just narrowly missed promotion to the 2. Bundesliga. The team lost several key players after the 1990–91 season: Heiko Bonan left for VfL Bochum, Burkard Reich for Karlsruher SC, Waldermar Ksienzyk and Eike Küttner for Blau-Weiß 1890 Berlin, Thorsten Boer for Chemnitzer FC and Hendrik Herzog for Schalke 04. FC Berlin would lose two complete teams during the first one or two years after the fall of the Berlin Wall.

FC Berlin recruited defenders Heiko Brestrich and Andreas Belka from BSV Rotation Berlin and midfielder Ralf Rambow from Eisenhüttenstädter FC Stahl for the 1991–92 season. Brestrich had originally been brought up in the youth department of BFC Dynamo and had made several appearances for the club in the DDR-Oberliga. Belka's background also involved the youth department of BFC Dynamo, and he had made appearances for the club in the DDR-Oberliga. The team was also joined by young defender Jens Reckmann and young midfielder Mike Jesse from the youth department. Jesse had already made a few appearances with the first team during the previous season. 1991–92 was the first season where teams from former East Germany and West Germany played in the same leagues. NOFV-Oberliga was now at the third tier in the German football league system. FC Berlin qualified for the 1991-92 DFB-Pokal, by having qualified for the play-offs for the 2. Bundesliga in the 1990–91 NOFV-Oberliga. FC Berlin played SC Freiburg from the 2. Bundesliga Süd in the first round, at the Stadion im Sportforum on 27 July 1991. The starting eleven included players such as Oskar Kosche, Christian Backs, Jens-Uwe Zöphel, Jörg Fügner, Mario Tolkmitt, and Mikhail Pronichev. SC Freiburg won the match 2–0. FC Berlin met Tennis Borussia Berlin in the NOFV-Oberliga Nord on 20 September 1991. At the time, the goalkeeper of Tennis Borussia Berlin was Bodo Rudwaleit. FC Berlin defeated Tennis Borussia Berlin 1–0 on a goal by Ralf Rambow. The team participated in an international friendly tournament in Thailand during the winter-break. FC Berlin reached the final. The team lost the final 0–2 against the Thailand national football team in front of 50,000 spectators on 31 January 1992.

FC Berlin would dominate the 1991–92 NOFV-Oberliga Nord. The team lost just two matches of the entire league season and finished the season in first place, scoring a total of 97 goals during the regular league season. Rehbein and Tolkmitt scored 16 goals each, Rambow scored 15 goals, and Pronichev scored 13 goals. FC Berlin once again qualified for the play-offs for the 2. Bundesliga. The team would meet Union Berlin from NOFV-Oberliga Mitte, FSV Zwickau from NOFV-Oberliga Süd, and VfL Wolfsburg from Oberliga Nord. FC Berlin lost 0–2 to VfL Wolfsburg in front of 2,495 spectators at Friedrich-Ludwig-Jahn-Stadion in the opening round on 24 May 1992. The bad start continued with a 2–0 loss away against FSV Zwickau in the second round. FC Berlin then defeated Union Berlin 3–0 at home in the third round. Olaf Backasch scored the first two goals for FC Berlin in the match. The team also defeated Union Berlin 4–0 away in the fifth round. However, it would lose its remaining matches, against VfL Wolfsburg and FSV Zwickau. FC Berlin finished the play-offs in third place and for the second season in a row missed promotion to 2. Bundesliga. Volkswagen-backed VfL Wolfsburg won the play-offs, which meant that no team from former East Germany was able to advance. FC Berlin would thus have to continue at an amateur level. The team lost 11 players after the 1991–92 season. Mario Tolkmitt for Bayer Leverkusen; Christian Backs and Andreas Belka left for Reinickendorfer Füchse; Jörn Lenz, Olaf Backasch, and Jörg Buder for Tennis Borussia Berlin; Jörg Fügner for SpVgg Bayreuth;  Andreas Nofz for VfL Oldenburg; and Oskar Kosche for FC Sachsen Leipzig.

FC Berlin returned to the Stadion im Sportforum at the beginning of the 1992–93 season. Coach Bogs would once again have to build a new team. For the season, FC Berlin recruited forward Bernd Jopek from PFV Bergmann-Borsig (he had also been with Union Berlin and SG Dynamo Fürstenwalde), midfielder Stefan Oesker from Blau-Weiß 1890 Berlin, and goalkeeper Markus Oster from Tennis Borussia Berlin. The team was also strengthened by a number of junior players, such as midfielder Ronny Nikol and forward Michael Franke. The club relied heavily on its youth department to supply the team with new players. Among the young players on the squad from the from the youth department were Mike Jesse, Jens Reckmann, Ronny Nikol and Michael Franke. The main competitors in the league were Tennis Borussia Berlin, BSV Brandenburg, and Eisenhütterstädter FC Stahl. FC Berlin lost 2–7 to Tennis Borussia Berlin at the Stadion im Sportforum on the 26th matchday, 22 March 1993. It was Bogs's biggest defeat so far as coach. The team met third-place FSV Schwedt at home on the 32nd matchday, 1 May 1993. Mikhail Pronichev put the score at 5-0 for FC Berlin in the 63rd minute. The team eventually won the match 6-3. Dirk Rehbein and Bernd Jopek scored two goals each in the match. FC Berlin finished the 1992–93 NOFV-Oberliga Nord in fourth place. After the season, Rehbein and Rolf Rambow left for Union Berlin, and Jopek for Spandauer SV.

Helmut Koch replaced Jürgen Bogs as coach on 28 September 1993. He had a background as a youth coach at BFC Dynamo. Koch also served as assistant coach to coach Helmut Jäschke in 1989. Bogs become the coach of league competitor FSV Schwedt instead. The team was joined by young midfielder Sebastian Müller from the reserve team of Bayer Leverkusen for the 1993–94 season. Müller had had a background in the youth department of BFC Dynamo. FC Berlin was no longer the absolute treasure trove among the former East German clubs as it was in the initial phase of German reunification, but the club continued to produce talented young players, thanks to its excellent academy system. Michael Franke, Marcell Fensch, and Rayk Schröder were some of the young players on the squad from the youth department. Heiko Brestrich, Mikhail Pronichev, Franke, Jens-Uwe Zöphel, Jens Reckmann, Mike Jesse, Stefan Oesker, Ronny Nikol, and Fensch were key players on the team during the season, with Brestrich as team captain. BSV Brandenburg and Eisenhütterstädter FC Stahl would once again be among the top competitors in the league. Jörn Lenz and Jens Henschel, from Tennis Borussia Berlin, briefly joined FC Berlin for the second half of the season. On 13 April 1994, the club was eliminated by Union Berlin in the quarter-finals of the 1993–94 Berlin Cup, after a penalty shootout at the Stadion an der Alten Försterei. The team defeated 1. FSV Schwerin 7–0 away on the last matchday, 15 May 1994. Jens Henschel and Stefan Oesker each scored two goals in the match. FC Berlin finished the 1993–94 NOFV-Oberliga Nord in fourth place and qualified for the re-instated Regionalliga, which would now form the new third tier in the German football league system. Mike Jesse left for BSV Brandenburg and Jörn Lenz and Jens Henschel returned to Tennis Borussia Berlin after the season.

Regionalliga (1994–1998)
Eberhard Landmann was elected new president on 20 May 1994. Landmann was seen as a man of the youth department, whose members had intervened for a long time against managing director Dr. Dieter Fuchs and former coach  Jürgens Bogs. Dr. Fuchs and Bogs were seen as stumbling blocks when searching for new sponsors. The 1994–95 Regionalliga Nordost season would involve new meetings with well-known opponents such as FC Carl Zeiss Jena, FC Rot-Weiß Erfurt, FC Sachsen Leipzig, FC Energie Cottbus, FC Erzgebirge Aue, and Tennis Borussia Berlin. It would also mean new derby matches against 1. FC Union Berlin. FC Berlin recruited defender Mario Kallnik from the reserve team of Stuttgart and Michael Steffen from BSV Brandenburg for the season. Kallnik had played for the BFC Dynamo youth teams before he joined the reserve team of VfB Stuttgart in 1992. Both Mikhail Pronichev and Stefan Oesker were out due to injuries and rehabilitation at the beginning of the season. The team of Helmut Koch included many young players. Seven players were under 22 years old, and five players were only 18 or 19 years old.

FC Berlin opened the 1994–95 Regionalliga Nordost with a 3-3 draw against Spandauer SV in front of 340 spectators at the Stadion im Sportforum on 31 July 1994. Then followed a 2-6 loss against the reserve team of Hertha BSC. The team struggled in the league and stood at 14th place after the first half of the season.  The presidency of Landmann proved short. Klaus Bittroff was elected new club president on 20 February 1995. Bittroff was elected with the votes 77-11. Bittrof had previously served as vice-president in the presidium of Dr. Wolfgang Hösrich. Volkmar Wanski was elected new vice-president. FC Berlin managed to win only nine out of 34 matches during the league season. The team reached the semi-finals of the 1994–95 Berlin Cup but was eliminated after a 1–2 loss to Türkiyemspor Berlin at the Friedrich-Ludwig-Jahn-Sportpark on 8 May 1995. FC Berlin finished the 1994–95 Regionalliga Nordost in 11th place and retained its place in the league, with FC Carl Zeiss Jena becoming the first champion of the Regionalliga Nordost. Jens-Uwe Zöphel left the team for FC Energie Cottbus, Rayk Schröder for Union Berlin, Ronny Nikol for 1. FC Nürnberg, Marcell Fensch for 1. FC Köln, and Stefan Oesker for VfB Lichterfelde after the season.

The goal of FC Berlin for the 1995–96 Regionalliga Nordost season was a solid middle position. The club recruited goalkeeper Ingo Rentzsch from FSV Lok Altmark Stendal, and attacking midfielder Niels Macken from Tennis Borussia Berlin for the season. The team was also joined by young goalkeeper Daniel Bartel, young midfielder Daniel Petrowsky and young midfielder Sven Ohly from the youth department. Bartel would become the new first-choice goalkeeper at the beginning of the season. The highlights of the season were the new duels with the old rival 1. FC Dynamo Dresden. The two teams had not met since the 1990–91 NOFV-Oberliga. The first meeting was played in front of 2,002 spectators at the Stadion im Sportforum on the eighth matchday, 8 September 1995. Heko Brestrich scored 1-0 for FC Berlin the fourth minute, but Thomas Hoßmang quickly equalized for 1. FC Dynamo Dresden. The score was 1–3 at half break. The match ended in a 4–3 victory for 1. FC Dynamo Dresden. Club President Bittrof resigned on 14 September 1995 and Volkmar Wanski became the new club president. Wanski was a building contractor from the western part of Berlin. Wanski had once upon a time taken his son to BFC Dynamo, when his son was six years old. He wanted him to become a decent football player. That was one year before Die Wende.

FC Berlin lost 0–2 at home to FC Rot-Weiß Erfurt at the Stadion im Sportforum on the 12th matchday, 15 October 1995. Coach Helmut Koch was dismissed two days later. FC Berlin had captured only eight points during the first 12 matches in the league and was now in the relegation zone. Werner Voigt became the new coach. He had a long history with the club as both player and youth coach.  FC Berlin was set to play against arch-rival 1. FC Union Berlin on the 13th matchday, 21 October 1995. The team was led by managing director Dr. Dieter Fuchs in the match, as Voigt had not yet arrived. FC Berlin lost the derby 1–3 in front in front of 2,170 spectators at the Stadion im Sportforum. Voigt took over on 4 November 1995. FC Berlin lost 2–4 away to Bischofswerdaer FV 08 in the first match under Voigt on the 14th matchday. Experienced defender Mario Maek also returned to the club. He was recruited, together with fellow midfielder Roman Müller, from SC Union 06 Berlin. Both made their first match against FC Hertha 03 Berlin-Zehlendorf at the Stadion im Sportforum on the 15th matchday, 11 November 1995. Mario Maek had been brought up from the youth department of BFC Dynamo and had played matches for BFC Dynamo in the European Cup. The team was on 15th place in the league after the first half of the season. Sven Ohly left for 1. FSV Schwerin during the winter break.

Improvement continued during the second half of the season. FC Berlin defeated FSV Lok Altmark Stendal 2–1 at home on the 20th matchday, 10 February 1996. The team was now undefeated in five consecutive matches under Voigt, including three draws.  The team then defeated FC Erzgebirge Aue 2–3 away on the 23nd matchday, 2 March 1996. FC Berlin was then set to play a return match against 1. FC Dynamo Dresden on the 25th matchday. The match was played in front of 7,340 spectators at the Rudolf-Harbig-Stadion on 16 March 1996. FC Berlin lost the match 0–1, on a late goal by Jörg Schmidt. The team then managed a 3–3 draw at home against FC Energie Cottbus on the 24th matchday, 20 March 1996. Then came a severe setback in a 1–3 defeat away to FSV Velten 1990 on the 19th matchday, 27 March 1996. FC Berlin was again in a difficult situation in the league. The team defeated Eisenhüttenstädter FC Stahl 5–0 at home on the 22nd matchday, 1 May 1996. Their place in the league was eventually saved with a 1–0 win over FSV Wacker 90 Nordhausen at the Stadion im Sportforum on the 33rd matchday, 19 May 1996. The winning goal was scored by Mario Maek. FC Berlin finished the 1995–96 Regionalliga Nordost in 13th place and retained its place in the league. Daniel Petrowsky left for Union Berlin after the season.

The millions the club had earned on player transfers in the early 1990s had now been used up. President Wanski would continue to make financial contributions to the club every year. However, the club's youth work remained successful. FC Berlin would have to put together a primarily young team every season with the help of its youth department, but the new team would hardly have had time to get together before the young players were recruited by larger clubs. The team was joined by young offensive midfielder Timo Lesch from the youth department for the 1996–97 season. Young forward Sven Ohly also return from 1. FSV Schwerin. Experienced players such as Heiko Brestrich, Mario Maek, and Jens Reckmann would form the team's backbone during the season. FC Berlin played 1. FC Dynamo Dresden on the opening matchday of the 1996–97 Regionalliga Nordost, 3 August 1996. The team won the match 2–0 in front of 2,300 spectators at the Friedrich-Ludwig-Jahn-Sportpark. Both goals were scored by Timo Lesch. However, FC Berlin suffered a major 0–6 defeat at home to its other rival Union Berlin on the ninth matchday, 28 September 1996. It was the biggest loss to Union Berlin so far. Former FC Berlin player Thorsten Boer scored two goals for Union Berlin.

Wolfgang Levin became the new managing director on 1 November 1996. He replaced Dr. Dieter Fuchs and would eventually serve as both manager and managing director. Dr. Fuchs had been the last functionary of the old era. Dr. Fuchs had skillfully managed the many player transfers of the early 1990s, but had not been successful in the search for new sponsors and the reorientation of the club. President Wanski became the shirt sponsor with his own company Regio Bautenschutz GmbH during the 1996–97 season. The shirts had not had a sponsor in almost seven years. FC Berlin also signed a two-year contract with the Italian sportswear manufacturer Fila in May 1997, where Fila became the club's equipment sponsor. Until then, FC Berlin had to pay for all equipment for its 19 teams, due to the club not having any equipment sponsor. Fila had reportedly been impressed by the youth development at FC Berlin. FC Berlin finished the 1996–97 Regionalliga Nordost in 13th place. Mikhail Pronichev left the team for TuS Makkabi Berlin and Jens Reckmann for 1. FC Dynamo Dresden after the season.

FC Berlin had sought cooperation in youth football with the Bundesliga club Werder Bremen, in order to give its 360 youth players better prospects. The club eventually entered into a partnership with the 2. Bundesliga club KFC Uerdingen in July 1997. FC Berlin was forced to reduce its budget for the 1997–98 season from 1.2 million to 900,000 Deutsche Mark. Forward Bernd Jopek returned from Spandauer SV. The club also recruited Croatian midfielder Davor Krznarić from the reserve team of Borussia Mönchengladbach. FC Berlin opened the 1997–98 Regionalliga Nordost with a close 0–1 loss to FC Sachsen Leipzig at the Stadion im Sportforum on 27 July 1997. However, there would be all the more goals in the following match. FC Berlin played to a 4–4 draw away against FC Rot-Weiß Erfurt on the second matchday, 2 August 1997. Managing director Wolfgang Levin eventually left for KFC Uerdingen on 30 September 1997. Former banker Dr. Volker Steinke became the new managing director on 1 December 1997. FC Berlin won only five, and lost nine, matches during the first half of the 1997–98 Regonalliga Nordost. The team lost 3-0 away to FC Sachsen Leipzig in the 18th matchday on 14 December 1997 and stood at 12th place in the league before the winter break. The club received New Year's greetings from Real Madrid and Liverpool F.C. during the winter of 1997–1998.

Experienced defender Jörn Lenz once again returned to the club during the winter break and would be a key player for several seasons to come. FC Berlin defeated FC Rot-Weiß Erfurt 1–0 on the 18th matchday, 25 January 1998, on a goal from Sebastian Müller. The team also defeated top-team Eisenhüttenstädter FC Stahl 3–1 on the 23th matchday, 22 February 1998. However, then followed weaker results and the team was in 11th place in the league after the 26th matchday. FC Berlin was drawn against VfB Lichterfelde in the quarterfinals of the 1997-98 Berlin Cup. The team lost the match 0-2 at the Stadion im Sportforum on 11 March 1998. After the disappointing loss, it became known that coach Voigt had signed for 1. FC Dynamo Dresden for the coming season. BFC Dynamo and Voigt then agreed to part ways. Assistant coach Ingo Rentzsch took over as interim coach on 12 March 1998. The results improved over the next matches. FC Berlin met 1. FC Magdeburg away on the 33rd matchday, 5 May 1998. Mario Lau made it 1–0 for 1. FC Magdeburg already in the first match minute. The score was 2–2 after only eight minutes played. The match eventually ended in a 5–5 draw.   Bernd Jopek, Jörn Lenz, Davor Krznarić, Marek Seruga, and Mario Kallnik scored one goal each in the match. The team then met arch-rival 1. FC Union Berlin at home on the final matchday, 9 May 1998. The score was 2–0 for 1. FC Union Berlin after 55 minutes played. The match eventually ended in a 2–2 draw after two goals by Timo Lesch and Davor Krznarić. FC Berlin finished the 1997–98 Regionalliga Nordost in ninth place. BFC Dynamo played a friendly match against Hamburger SV on 17 May 1998. The team lost the match 2-3, in front of 1,105 spectators at the Stadion im Sportforum. Serugna and Jopek scored on goal each against Hamburger SV.

Renaming and first Berlin Cup victory (1998–1999)
Henry Häusler was the new coach for the 1998–99 season. He was largely able to continue with the team from last season and did not have to build a completely new team. FC Berlin recruited midfielder Martino Gatti from FC Homburg for the season. Players central to the team were Heiko Brestrich, Jörn Lenz, Mario Maek, Martino Gatti, Mario Kallnik, Davor Krznarić, Timo Lesch, and Sven Ohly, with Lenz as team captain. Sebastian Müller left the team for SV Babelsberg 03 at the start of the season. FC Berlin had a difficult start to the 1998–99 Regionalliga Nordost season, with matches against Carl Zeiss Jena, Erzgebirge Aue and FSV Zwickau. but the team was undefeated after nine matchdays. FC Berlin defeated VfB Leipzig 2–1 at home on the ninth matchday, 26 September 1998, and held first place in the league. Their first loss came against 1. FC Dynamo Dresden away on the 10th matchday, 10 October 1998. FC Berlin met Union Berlin on the 16th matchday on 5 December 1998. The team lost the derby 3-0 in front of 2,611 spectators at the Stadion im Sportforum. Coach Häusler complained about his small squad, while Club President Volkmar Wanski criticized the players' performance and threatened consequences. After the first half of the season, FC Berlin stood at ninth place in the league.

President Wanski came up with the idea of reclaiming the old club name of BFC Dynamo in the autumn of 1998. He said: "We stand by Dynamo's sporting tradition, we reject the club's political past." Mitteldeutscher Rundfunk conducted a survey among its viewers which showed that 67 percent were in favour of returning to the name of BFC Dynamo. The club received 150 new membership applications after that. At the general meeting on 3 May 1999, an overwhelming majority voted to take back the old club name. The club also reclaimed its East German crest, although the rights to the crest now belonged to fan merchandise dealer Peter Klaus-Dieter "Pepe" Mager.

FC Berlin defeated 1. FC Dynamo Dresden 2–1 at home in a return match on the 27th matchday, 2 April 1999, with Heiko Brestrich and Davor Krznarić scoring one goal each. Then followed two losses to 1. VFC Plauen and Chemnitzer FC on the next two matchdays. Coach Häusler was eventually dismissed on 29 April 1999 and was replaced by Ingo Rentzsch. The team met local rival Union Berlin on the penultimate matchday, 8 May 1999. The team now again competed as BFC Dynamo. Coach Rentzsch threw in the towel at half-time and left the stadium, allegedly because President Wanski had wanted to dictate the line-up. Rentzsch wanted to exchange the very popular Heiko Brestrich.  Wanski interfered against the exchange for "club political reasons".  Youth trainer Norbert Paepke took over as coach in the second half of the match. BFC Dynamo won the derby 2–0 with two goals by Marcel Solomo, in front of 2,543 spectators at the Stadion an der Alten Försterei.

BFC Dynamo had success in the 1998–99 Berlin Cup. The team was qualified for its first Berlin Cup final. BFC Dynamo defeated Berlin Türkspor 1965 4–1 in the final at the Fredrich-Ludwig-Jahn-Sportpark on 11 May 1999 and won its first Berlin Cup. Ayhan Gezen and Mario Maek scored one goal each and Heiko Brestrich scored two goals for BFC Dynamo. Supporters of BFC Dynamo invaded the pitch after the final whistle to celebrate the title. Some supporters also attacked players of Berlin Türkspor 1965. Club President Wanski immediately apologized for the behavior at the press conference after the match. The Turkish association in Berlin-Brandenburg (TBB) demanded that BFC Dynamo be excluded from the coming DFB-Pokal and that the chairman of the Berlin Football Association (BFV) Otto Höhne resign. However, Höhne announced that the victory for BFC Dynamo could not be questioned. BFC Dynamo and Berlin Türkspor 1965 then agreed to meet in a friendly match in the coming season and to organize a joint meal for players. Klaus Goldbach took over as coach before the last matchday of the league season. BFC Dynamo defeated FC Rot-Weiß Erfurt 2–0 on the last matchday and finished the 1998–99 Regionalliga Nordost in eighth place. Davor Krznarić and Sven Ohly left for SV Babelsberg 03, Timo Lesch for 1. FC Magdeburg and Bernd Jopek for FSV Fortuna Pankow after the season.

Relegation to the Oberliga and new sponsor (1999–2000)
The 1999–2000 Regonalliga Nordost would be decisive, as the league was going to be dissolved after the season, with the German football league system being reduced to two divisions. The seven best teams in the 1999–2000 Regionalliga Nordost would be allowed to continue in the two remaining top divisions, and the winner would have the opportunity to participate in play-offs for the 2. Bundesliga. The remaining teams would be relegated to the NOFV-Oberliga. BFC Dynamo recruited goalkeeper Nico Thomaschewski, striker Thorsten Boer and midfielder Norman Struck from Union Berlin, and Dirk Rehbein from Tennis Borussia Berlin for the season. Both Boer and Rehbein had previously played for BFC Dynamo and FC Berlin. Jens Reckmann returned from Dynamo Dresden. The team was also joined by young forward Marcel Riediger from the BFC Dynamo U19 team. Marcel Riediger was the son of Hans-Jürgen Riediger and had played in BFC Dynamo since the age of eight. The squad now included several experienced players such as Jörn Lenz, Mario Maek, Heiko Brestrich, Thorsten Boer, Dirk Rehbein, Martino Gatti and Jens Reckmann.

BFC Dynamo drew DSC Arminia Bielefeld from the Bundesliga as their opponent in the second round of the 1999-2000 DFB-Pokal. The team lost the match 0–2 in front of 2,399 spectators at Friedrich-Ludwig-Jahn-Sportpark on 7 August 1999. Their league season started well, with a 6–1 win at home against FSV Zwickau on the second matchday and a 1–0 win at home against Dynamo Dresden on the sixth matchday. BFC Dynamo was in second place in the league after the eighth matchday. However, then followed matches mostly without a win. BFC Dynamo was defeated 5-3 away by lower-table side FSV Lok Altmark Stendal on the ninth matchday. The defeat was the start of a sharp decline in the league. The team met arch-rival 1. FC Union Berlin at home on the 12th matchday on 23 November 1999. The team lost 0-3 in front of 4,220 spectators at the Stadion im Sportforum.

The club suffered a number of crisis during the autumn of 1999. The financial difficulties continued for the club. The number of sponsors was not enough. The club was financially dependent on President Volkmar Wanski, and the need for money increased. The number of spectators also remained low and new sponsors were deterred by hooliganism. The player budget had amounted to approximately 2,3 million Deutsche Mark for the 1999–2000 season, which was almost double compared to the previous season. Revenues for the draft budget were 800,000 Deutsche Mark short and the club had difficulty paying salaries at the beginning of the season. Heiko Brestrich was suspended and eventually transferred to VfB Leipzig in the autumn. A revolt against coach Klaus Goldbach was allegedly the reason for his abrupt departure. His last match for BFC Dynamo was the away against Eisenhüttenstädter FC Stahl on the 13th matchday, 6 November 1999. Brestrich had played in a total of 301 matches for BFC Dynamo during his career. Brestrich was very popular with the supporters of BFC Dynamo and was popularly called "Heiko Brestrich - Football God".

BFC Dynamo was defeated 1-3 away by SV Babelsberg 03 on the 14th matchday, 13 November 1999. Immediately after the defeat in Babelsberg, managing director Horst Göhler resgned. Göhler cited non-payment of salary for a long time and defamatory statements from President Wanski as reasons for his resignation. Göhler, who was the successor to managing director Dr. Volkmar Steinke, had been away from the club since September, due to health issues. He had been heavily criticised by President Wanski for his failure to win new sponsors and lack of economic concept. The team was joined by Russian striker Denis Kozlov from FC Rot-Weiß Erfurt at the end of the autumn. Kozlov made his debut against Dresdner SC on the 15th matchday, 20 November 1999. Coach Goldbach was eventually dismissed after a 0–3 loss to VfB Leipzig away on the 16th matchday, 4 December 1999. He was replaced by Jürgen Bogs, who returned to the club for his third stint as coach. Norbert Paepke became the assistant coach to Bogs. BFC Dynamo lost 1–2 to the reserve team of Tennis Borussia Berlin in the first match under Bogs on the 17th matchday, 11 December 1999.

Hans Reker became new sports director on 1 January 2000. Reker and the new marketing officer Günter Haake were no strangers to the Sportforum Hohenschönhausen. The duo had a background at Eisbären Berlin. Haake had previously served as managing director and Reker as marketing director at Eisbären Berlin. The duo were not kept when American sporting entertainment presenter Anschutz Entertainment Group took over Eisbären Berlin in August 1999. BFC Dynamo finally received a promising new main sponsor, in the form of computer software company Lipro AG, at the beginning of 2000. Lipro AG explained that BFC Dynamo had been chosen because the club pursued ambitious sporting plans based on excellent youth work. The new sponsor was signed through the efforts of sports director Hans Reker. It was stated that the sponsorship would amount to a seven-digit sum over the next one or two years. A special bonus would also be awarded if the club reached the third tier. However, the difficulties in advancing in the league continued, and the club had debts of around 500,000 Deutsche Mark for the season.  BFC Dynamo was defeated 3–7 by the reserve team of Tennis Borussia Berlin in the final matchday, 20 May 2000. The team eventually finished the 1999–2000 Regionalliga Nordost in 17th place and was relegated to NOFV-Oberliga Nord. The team reached the final of the Berlin Cup for the second season in a row. BFC Dynamo lost 0–2 to the reserve team of Tennis Borussia Berlin in the final of the 1999-2000 Berlin Cup, on 31 May 2000.

Club President Volkmar Wanski, vice president Ralf Rose, and treasurer Günter Mattkies resigned on 29 June 2000. The reason for the resignation of President Wanski was allegedly that the sponsor Lipro AG demanded greater influence in club decision making. Lipro AG contributed 80 percent of the funds at the time. The sponsor was closely associated with sports director Hans Reker. Reker was appointed acting president by the economic council and was now temporarily in full control of the club. The team lost several players after the 1999–2000 season. Mario Maek retired as a player; he would instead take on on the role of managing director of the club. Thorsten Boer returned to Union Berlin, Martino Gatti left for SV Babelsberg 03, Marcel Solomo for FC Erzgebige Aue, Tolga Günes for Tennis Borussia Berlin, and Norman Struck for VfL Halle 96.

Near promotion and crash (2000–2001)
The budget for the new season was once again about 2.3 million Deutsche Mark. It was a new record for NOFV-Oberliga Nord. A new team was put together for the 2000–01 season. BFC Dynamo recruited striker Dirk Vollmar from Kickers Offenbach, midfielder Sebastian Hahn from the reserve team of F.C. Hansa Rostock, and Cameroonian midfielder Aka Adek Mba from Odra Opole, as well as the Romanian players Aurel Panait, Silvian Cristescu, and Dănuț Oprea. Jörn Lenz was again team captain. Puma became the club's new equipment sponsor for the 2000–01 season. The new team was ten percent more expensive than the Regionalliga team of the previous season, according to Hans Reker. BFC Dynamo played to a 1–1 draw against Eintracht Frankfurt in a friendly match on 9 July 2000. The goal of the season was to advance to Regionalliga Nord. To win promotion, the team would also have to defeat the winner of NOFV Oberliga-Süd in a play-off.

Karin Halsch was elected new club president on 27 September 2000. Halsch had earlier been a member of the Economic Council and was an active politician within the social democratic SPD. BFC Dynamo had started the league season with mixed results. The team defeated Eisenhüttenstädter FC Stahl 3–0 at home on the ninth matchday, 14 October 2000. The match was a turning point. On the following four matchdays, the team defeated FC Anker Wismar 4–0 away, SV Schwarz-Rot Neustadt 3–0 at home, FV Motor Eberswalde 4–0 away, and Türkiyemspor Berlin 3–0 at home. The legal dispute with Peter Mager over the rights to the club's East German crest was not yet resolved. Club vice president René Lau announced that the club considered itself the sole owner of the crest. BFC Dynamo initiated legal proceedings against Mager on 20 November 2000 to regain the rights to its former crest. BFC Dynamo came to dominate the 2000–01 NOFV-Oberliga Nord. The team won the last seven matches before the winter break and finished the first half of the season in first place, as Herbstmeister.

Former elite sprinter and Olympic gold medallist Doris Maletzki became the new managing director on 15 February 2001. Bodo Rudwaleit also returned to the club as goalkeeping coach. He joined the coaching staff of Jürgen Bogs. The other two members of the coaching staff were Mario Maek and assistant coach Norbert Paepke. BFC Dynamo met Union Berlin in the Round of 16 of the 2000–01 Berlin Cup. Union won the match 3–0 in front of 4,427 spectators at Friedrich-Ludwig-Jahn-Sportpark on 24 March 2001. Riots broke out among supporters of BFC Dynamo after the match. Police deployed water cannons against supporters on Eberswalder Straße and Schönhauser Allee. Club President Halsch expressed sadness that the riots destroyed reconstruction work in the club and announced that there would be many stadium bans. BFC Dynamo lost only three matches during the league season and finished the 2000–01 NOFV-Oberliga Nord in first place. Denis Kozlov scored a total of 29 goals for BFC Dynamo during the league season. The team would now face Magdeburg in a play-off for promotion to the Regionalliga Nord. Promotion to the Regionalliga Nord would mean 750,000 Deutsche Mark in guaranteed television money.

It had become apparent that the club had financial problems two weeks before the play-offs. Players and coaches had received their January salaries in March and had not received any salaries since. The club was also behind with insurance payments. Halsch explained that the payments could not be made due to unexpectedly low contributions from sponsor Lipro AG. Sports director Hans Reker countered that Lipro AG had fulfilled all commitments. The club also had remaining debt from the era of Volkmar Wanski. Wanski himself demanded the club pay him 450,000 Deutsche Mark. It was clear even before the first meeting with Magdeburg that BFC Dynamo would have difficulty meeting the requirements of the DFB in the event of promotion. BFC Dynamo would need to provide a bank guarantee of 4,2 million Deutsche Mark to secure the budget for the 2001–02 Regionalliga Nord. A similar requirement was also placed on Magdeburg.

The first match of the play-offs was played in front 8,282 spectators at the Stadion Sportforum on 2 June 2001. Magdebug defender Marcel Rozgonyi received a red card in the 18th minute. Denis Kozlov and Dănuț Oprea then came close to making it 1–0 for BFC Dynamo in the 27th minute. Kozlov had another chance in the 35th minute, but Magdeburg goalkeeper Mirosław Dreszer got the ball. The score was 0–0 at half-time. Adolphus Ofodile had a chance to make it 1–0 for Magdeburg 15 minutes into the second half. Dănuț Oprea then received a red card in the 72nd minute and Mageburg now began to take over the match. Armando Zani had an opportunity to make it 1–0 in the 82nd minute, but Nico Tomaschewski blocked the shot. The match eventually ended at 0–0. The second match was played at the Ernst-Grube-Stadion in Magdeburg on 9 June 2001. About 2,000 supporters of BFC Dynamo had travelled to see the match. Mageburg took the lead twice in the first half, but Silvian Cristescu and Denis Kozlov were able to equalize. The score was 2–2 at half-time. BFC Dynamo was practically promoted at this point. However, Josef Ivanović made it 3–2 for Magdeburg in the 73rd minute. Florian Baintru was then sent off after a second yellow card in the 76th minute. Magdeburg then made another two goals at the end of the match. BFC Dynamo lost the match 2–5 and Magdeburg won promotion to Regionalliga Nord. However, Magdeburg also had financial problems. It was unclear whether Magdeburg would be able to provide the required seven-digit bank guarantee. However, BFC Dynamo announced on 11 June 2001 that the club would refrain from seeking promotion if Magdeburg failed to obtain a license. The club would simply not be able to collect the amount required in such a short time.

Hans Reker had played down the late salaries as a "misunderstanding". When the players had tried to cash the checks they had been issued by Reker, they found out that the account was empty. BFC Dynamo was dependent on main sponsor Lipro AG. However, Lipro AG was also now in financial trouble. It was now unclear how the budget for next season would be financed. The club's debts allegedly amounted to approximately 1.5 million Deutsche Mark. President Karin Halsch announced that the club had set a deadline. The current liabilities would be paid before the end of the month. Otherwise, the club would file for insolvency. The new season would formally begin in July 2001. If insolvency proceedings were opened after that, the club would be automatically relegated to the fifth tier Verbandsliga Berlin. The club was allegedly behind 500,000 Deutsche Mark in salaries and insurance payments since the beginning of the year. In addition, there were another 500,000 Deutsche Mark of old debts. Marcel Riediger left for FC Erzgebirge Aue, and other top players started to leave the club. Striker Denis Kozlov was about to move to Dynamo Dresden. Florin Bătrânu was allegedly about to move to K.V. Mechelen, Silvian Cristescu to Grasshopper Club Zürich, and Dorel Zegrean to ACF Gloria Bistrița. Halsch wanted to file for insolvency, but Hans Reker and main sponsor Lipro AG decided against an immediate initiation of insolvency proceedings. Hans Reker claimed he had obtained 39 new sponsors. Halsch announced her resignation on 25 June 2001. She stated that she had been denied access to documents and could not lead the club under such conditions. Halsch claimed she only knew of an advertising contract with Lipro AG. Others documents had allegedly not been shown to her. The club's total debts were now estimated to be 4 million Deutsche Mark. The insurance company Allgemeine Ortskrankenkasse (AOK) filed for insolvency against the club on 21 June 2001. AOK demanded 126,000 Deutsche Mark in overdue insurance payments.

Insolvency (2001–2004)

The financial crisis (2001)
BFC Dynamo did not have the 126,000 Deutsche Mark that AOK demanded. Supporters of BFC Dynamo started a fundraiser under the name "Save the BFC" to save the club from insolvency. The fundraiser quickly collected 40,000 Deutsche Mark. The planned budget for the coming season was reduced from 2.5 million to 1.3 million Deutsche Mark. Only five regular players were to be retained. They were Nico Thomaschewski, Jörn Lenz, Sebastinan Hahn, Aurel Panait, and Dănuț Oprea. Jürgen Bogs and the team went to training camp in Karlovy Vary on 8 July 2001. Silvian Cristescu and Aka Adeck Mba were not in attendance. The club management now decided to postpone the ongoing dispute with Pepe Mager over the rights to the East German crest. BFC Dynamo held an extraordinary general meeting on 10 July 2001. Hans Reker had accompanied the team to training camp and did not attend the meeting. Vice President Günter Haake admitted that the budget for the coming season was only partially covered, but claimed that a new sponsorship contract with Lipro AG was ready to be signed. Demands for resignation and criminal prosecution of the presidium were raised during the meeting. Former club president Halsch again criticized her former colleagues in the presidium and reiterated that she had been denied access to contracts. She received applause at her farewell. Halsch also handed over a check for 10,000 Deutsche Mark to the youth department.

More players left the team during the summer. Sebastian Hahn left for FC Rot-Weiss Essen, Mario Kallnik and Aka Adeck Mba for 1. FC Magdeburg and Falk Jarling for F.C. Hansa Rostock. Kallnik had played in a total of 242 matches for BFC Dynamo since the 1994-95 season. The total debts were now estimated at 5.5 million Deutsche Mark, of which 4.2 million were alleged to be loans from Lipro AG and 1.3 million were alleged to be current liabilities. The club founded the spinoff company BFC Marketing GmbH to facilitate collaborations. The professional team could be outsourced to the spin-off company. AOK would accept payment in instalments and demanded an initial installment of 50,000 Deutsche Mark on 16 July 2001. But some of the money raised by the supporters had been used to make payments to players and coaches. No payment to AOK had yet been made by the end of July 2001. In early August 2001, sports director Reker traveled to Moscow to discuss a partnership with FC Dynamo Moscow. The plan was for FC Dynamo Moscow to invest in BFC Marketing GmbH and for BFC Dynamo to serve as a farm team for FC Dynamo Moscow in Europe. The purpose was a collaboration in player transfers and sponsors between the two clubs. The club had support from the former state secretary of the Russian Embassy in its contacts with FC Dynamo Moscow. Vice President Günter Haake was a functionary in EHC Dynamo Berlin during the German reunification and had had good contacts in Russia since the East German era. Haake had recently served as managing director of Eisbären Berlin.

Former goalkeeper and ten-time East German champion Bodo Rudwaleit agreed to help the team as the reserve goalkeeper, behind Nico Tomaschewski, in the match against VfB Lichterfelde in NOFV-Oberliga Nord on 15 August 2001. Rudwaleit was 44 years old at the time. The new reserve goalkeeper Lubomir Padalik had not yet received permission to play. A preliminary insolvency administrator was appointed for the club. All expenses would now need to be approved by the administrator. The remaining three Romanian players did not participate with the team from mid-August. Silvian Cristescu and Dănuț Oprea had traveled to Romania because they did not receive their salaries. Reker stated that Lipro AG signed a contract for the current season and was still the club's sponsor. He pointed out that Lipro AG had taken over most of the club's old debts and that it was thanks to Lipro AG that the club had been able to avoid a crisis last season. BFC Dynamo defeated Eisenhüttenstädter FC Stahl 4–0 away, with two goals by Tomasz Suwary, on the fourth matchday, 29 August 2001.

No sign was forthcoming from FC Dynamo Moscow. An agreement was reached with the employment office and a bank through the preliminary insolvency administrator. The bank would pay the next three salaries and then receive compensation from the employment service in the event of insolvency. The first salary payment was to take place on 15 September 2001. BFC Dynamo was now also the subject of an insolvency application from the insurance provider Barmer. The two insurance companies AOK and Barmer together demanded approximately 250,000 Deutsche Mark. In addition, the club had debts of about 250,000 Deutsche Mark in unpaid salaries. Administrator Philipp Hackländer estimated that the insolvency proceedings against BFC Dynamo would open on 1 November 2001. The club would be automatically relegated to the Verbandsliga and would have to play the rest of the season as mandatory friendly matches if insolvency proceedings were opened. The squad had been reduced to just 17 players, with several injuries, before the match against MSV Neuruppin on 17 September 2001. Insolvency proceedings were opened against main sponsor Lipro AG on 5 October 2001. Sports director Reker became a scapegoat for the club's financial problems because he had put together a very expensive team for the previous season and had promised rescue for several months without results.

Administrator Hackländer estimated that the club's total debts might amount to 6 million Deutsche Mark. In order to commence insolvency proceedings, BFC Dynamo would need approximately 30,000 Deutsche Mark by 31 October 2001. If the insolvency proceedings could not be opened due to lack of funds, the club risked bankruptcy and dissolution. BFC Dynamo would then have to restart in the Kreisliga under a new name. Press spokesman Holger Zimmerman confirmed that the 30,000 Deutsche Mark required to commence insolvency proceedings were not yet available. On 26 October 2001, supporters of BFC Dynamo organized a demonstration to save the club. Also former professional players such as Hans-Jürgen Riediger, Waldemar Ksienzyk, Rainer Troppa, and Heiko Brestrich, as well as many of the club's youth players, intended to participate. The demonstrators marched from the Sportforum Hohenschönhausen to the Rotes Rathaus, where it was received by former club president and SPD politician Karin Halsch. During the demonstration, the senator for sports of Berlin and SPD politician Klaus Böger appealed to the business community in Berlin to help the club.

Insolvency (2001–2002)
Discussions with new sponsors failed. It was uncertain whether BFC Dynamo would succeed in raising the amount of money required to commence insolvency proceedings and avoid bankruptcy. As of 26 October 2001, the money had not yet been transferred to the preliminary insolvency administrator. Preliminary insolvency administrator Wolfgang Schröder now estimated the club's total debts could amount to as much as 7 million Deutsche Mark, which corresponded to approximately 3.57 million Euros. A sponsor group around former club president Volkmar Wanski eventually stepped forward and offered the 30,000 Deutsche Mark required to commence insolvency proceedings. BFC Dynamo defeated SV Nord Wedding 1893 3–1 at home in the 2001-02 Berlin Cup on 27 October 2001. It was the team's last match before insolvency. The club competed with a rump team. Goalkeeper Thomaschewski even had to play libero. Young defender Robert Rudwaleit, who was the son of Bodo Rudwaleit and who had now  also landed at BFC Dynamo, made his first appearance with the first team of BFC Dynamo in the match. The entire presidium of Hans Reker, Günter Haake, and Emil Lindemann resigned on 31 October 2001. An emergency board formed by André Sommer, Rayk Bernt, and press spokesman Zimmermann was appointed by the Economic Council. The emergency board was intended to serve until the extraordinary general meeting on 26 November 2001. No new president was appointed for the emergency board.

Wanski explained that BFC Dynamo had a long sports tradition and must not go under. More than 400 children and young people still played football as part of the club. Therefore, he and other sponsors had decided to help. FC Berlin is said to have made several millions on player sales after Die Wende. When Thomas Doll was sold by Hamburger SV to S.S. Lazio in 1991, the club earned additional money from a percentage of the transfer fee. The club was for a time considered the richest amateur club in Germany. However, not all money from player sales had gone to the club. Some of the money had also gome to SV Dynamo, the DFV, and advisors. The DFV allegedly took 15 percent of the transfer fee for Andreas Thom. A larger sum would also have been made available to the East German Ministry of Health. Advisor Michael Prawitz would then have received 10 percent of the transfer fee for his assistance during the negotiations. Managing director Dr. Dieter Fuchs claimed that the club had between 3 and 4 million Deutsche Mark in its bank accounts in June 1991. But the club's reputation as the former Stasi club made it hard to find new sponsors. The club was also plagued by hooliganism. Riots among supporters repeatedly caused negative headlines. Club management had allowed themselves to be lured into dubious business deals. The club was alleged to have invested in scooters, which were intended to be later sold at a profit. At one point, about 250 scooters were said to have been standing in the air dome in the Sportforum Hohenschönhausen. It later turned out that they were not adapted to the European market and had to be retrofitted. The total loss in this unsuccessful business should have amounted to 300,000 Deutsche Mark. FC Berlin never managed to get past the play-offs for the 2. Bundesliga and never made it beyond the third tier. The club had just a couple of hundred spectators on average per match at the beginning of the 1990s and the income from membership fees was marginal. Former Club President Dr. Wolfgang Hösrich said: "For a long time we lived off the sales of our best people. But at some point this money became less because we too needed new players". FC Berlin also maintained a large youth department which at one point cost about 400,000 Deutsche Mark per year. When Wolfgang Levin became managing director in November 1996, the club had no debts, but also no longer any money in its bank accounts. President Wanski would then need to support the club with personal financial contributions every year. Wanski invested an estimated 3 million Deutsche Mark of private money in the club over five years before his resignation.

At the beginning of 2000, BFC Dynamo gained Lipro AG as a promising main sponsor. Millions of Deutsche Mark would now be available. At the same time, the club's liabilities had started to become significant and club president Wanski granted the club a loan of 500,000 Deutsche Mark. Sports director Hans Reker now started to sign new players, and the club made an effort to reach the third tier Regionalliga. However, the millions from Lipro AG later turned out to be loans. Wanski repeatedly spoke out against the old presidium during the financial crisis and accused former sports director Reker of mismanagement. Wanski estimated that the club's debts were 380,000 Deutsche Mark when he resigned in June 2000. The debts were then estimated at more than 6 million Deutsche Mark one season later. About 3 million Euros in debt had allegedly accumulated under sports director Reker, according to German newspaper Die Tageszeitung. Wanski accused the old presidium of doing too little to prevent bankruptcy during the financial crisis and speculated that the old presidium might have preferred that the club was dissolved. The books would then be closed for good. Wanski wanted to take legal action against Reker and the CEO of Lipro AG Dieter Küchler.

The emergency board of Sommer, Bernt, and Zimmermann was considered to represent the interests of the sponsor group around Wanski. That board announced that it would bear the costs of the insolvency proceedings. Two members, Sommer and Bernt, were controversial because of connection to the motorcycle club Hells Angels. However, both were also long-time supporters; Sommer had been a member of the hooligan scene during the 1980s. But when the hooligan scene drifted towards the political right in the late 1980s, his involvement lessened. So far, Sommer and Bernt had mainly taken care of a beer stand for VIP guests at the stadium. Wanski protested against the claim that Sommer and Bernt were his confidants and distanced himself from the crimes associated with the Hells Angels. However, he also stated that the duo had saved the club from bankruptcy, because they alone had contacted him only hours before the deadline for payment of the money for the opening of the insolvency proceedings. Zimmermann resigned from the emergency board on 23 November 2001 because he thought that Sommer and Bernt had given the club an image he could not identify with. A new presidium was intended to be elected at the extraordinary general meeting on 26 November 2001. However, the meeting agenda was changed with the votes 87 to 59 at the insistence of the emergency board. The meeting was then converted into an "information event" and new elections were postponed. Some members felt that they had been blackmailed. Sommer and Bernt continued to lead the club during the opening of the insolvency proceedings, but the legitimacy of their presidium was questioned. Sommer emphasized that they were only a transitional presidium and that there would be the election of a new presidium the following year. He considered that they should await the  outcome of the insolvency proceedings. Also, former club president Wanski had said that he was against new elections and more in favor of the former board having to accept their responsibility for the debt burden.

Insolvency proceedings were opened on 1 November 2001, and all contracts with professionals and employees were terminated. The club had to continue under amateur conditions, and the players could only be offered 300 Euros per month. Only three players from the previous squad remained for the first mandatory friendly match after the opening of the proceedings, including the new captain Piotr Rowicki. The rest of the squad came from the club's second and third teams. Jörn Lenz left for VfB Leipzig, Nico Thomaschewski for SV Babelsberg 03, and Marcel Niespodziany for Füchse Berlin Reinickendorf. Dănuț Oprea returned to Romania, and Jürgen Bogs also announced that he would not continue. Former assistant coach Mario Maek became the new coach. He was assisted by goalkeeping coach Bodo Rudwaleit. Norbert Paepke took on the role as office manager at BFC Dynamo. Maek and Rudwaleit were now tasked as coaches with building a new team for the 2002-03 Verbandsliga Berlin. It would allegedly require 300,000-500,000 Deutsche Mark to resurrect the club. However, the club's bank accounts were empty. The youth department had also dropped from 400 members to less than 300 members in a short time.

Mario Maek led the team on a volunteer basis. BFC Dynamo participated in the 24th edition of the annual indoor tournament for all Berlin clubs in the NOFV-Oberliga in the Sporthalle Charlottenburg 5–6 January 2002. The team reached the play-offs after equalizing against Türkiyemspor Berlin 12 seconds before the final whistle. BFC Dynamo drew 1,500 spectators during the tournament. The club once again had to rely on its youth players. The average age of the squad was only 20 during the indoor tournament. It was still unclear whether the insolvency proceedings could be brought to a positive conclusion. The club was estimated to have about 144 different creditors. Insolvency administrator Hackländer estimated that 220,000 Euros would be required to succeed in the insolvency proceedings. Most of the money would need to be used to pay the club's debts for salaries to players and employees. The remaining creditors would have to share about 20,000 Euros. The club was contacted by the Swiss businessman Albert Koller, who might be interested in assisting the club and had experience in insolvency proceedings, having helped FC Luzern and Young Boys Bern out of similar situations. He traveled to Berlin and visited the club in the Sportforum Hohenschönhausen. BFC Dynamo was still participating in the 2001–02 Berlin Cup. The team was drwan against VfB Fortuna Biesdorf in the Round of 16. The match was played at the Stadion im Sportforum on 13 March 2002. The team had difficulties putting a team together for the match. The match was played in the middle of the week. Only 9 players from the reserve team were available, the rest were either tied to their military service or prevented from participating because of work. Both Mario Maek and Bodo Ruwaleit therefore had to joined the team as players. BFC Dynamo lost the match 1-6 and was eliminated form the cup.

Sommer and Bernt still met with great resistance due to their membership in Hells Angels, which had a deterrent effect; and they failed to win any new sponsors. They themselves admitted that they had achieved nothing.  Members had collected signatures to elect a new presidium. Although the required number of signatures was collected, the signatures were ignored by Sommer and Bernt. As a result, the former coach of the women's team Volkmar Lucius decided to take legal action for violation of the statutes. The Sommer and Bernt presidium was then finally overthrown by Lucius and supporters through a successful application to the Charlottenburg District Court. The court appointed Lucius as an emergency board member on 30 April 2002. Lucius then called a general meeting for 31 May 2002. However, Sommer and Bernt had, after all, helped make sure that the insolvency proceedings could be opened by their personal financial contributions. Fan representative Rainer Lüdtke would later say that Sommer and Bernt had actually saved the club as emergency directors in the autumn of 2001. Bernt acquired the rights to the former crest from Pepe Mager in June 2002. Sommer and Bernt also ran the sports pub Berliner Fußball-Café in Lichtenberg at the time. The sports pub was popular with some parts of the supporter scene. But the duo would no longer have much say in the club by 2003. However, Sommer had one child in the youth teams and would continue to sponsor the club for a few years, with personal financial contributions and through his various establishments. In 2006, BFC Dynamo ended sponsorship contracts with companies with alleged links to the Hells Angels.

Restart in the Verbandsliga (2002–2003)
The supporter interest group IG BFC'er had been looking for a suitable new board member. Mike Peters was finally persuaded to run for president. Mike Peters was the owner of a staffing company with 50 employees in Hohenschönhausen. The company had a turnover of 2.5 million Euros per year at the time. Mike Peters was elected the new president of BFC Dynamo at the general meeting on 31 May 2002. Dirk Fischer and Axel Kusch were elected vice presidents. Sven Radicke was elected treasurer. The election of Peters as new club president is considered no less than the rescue of BFC Dynamo. This positive development was largely made possible through the commitment of a number of dozen supporters around Fan representative Rainer Lüdtke. Creditors' preferential claims of about 200,000 Euros had seemed insurmountable, but supporters had negotiated with creditors, including former players and officials, and received numerous waivers. Supporters also set up a donations account and collected at least 13,800 Euros themselves. Finally, the new presidium would provide around 100,000 Euros for the insolvency plan. The former BFC Dynamo player Dirk Vollmar would become the new coach on a voluntarily basis for the coming season. Bodo Rudwaleit continued as an assistant coach. However, the club did not yet have a complete team for the coming season. President Mike Peters would fund a large portion of the budget for the 2002–03 Verbandsliga Berlin season. The planned budget for the club amounted to about 125,000 Euros.

The supporters installed bucket seats at Stadion im Sportforum during the summer. They would also build a new clubhouse next to the grandstand during the season. The new clubhouse was intended to be run independently by the supporters. Goalkeeper Nico Tomaschewski returned from SV Babelsberg 03 and Aka Adeck Mba returned from 1. FC Magdeburg for the 2002-03 Verbandsliga Berlin season. The team was also joined by defender Robert Rudwaleit from the reserve team, midfielder Philipp Wanski from the reserve team of Hannover 96, defensive midfielder Uwe Lehmann from FSV Optik Rathenow, and midfielder Michael Dehnert from SV Germania Schöneiche. Robert Rudwaleit was the son of Bodo Rudwaleit and had made three appearances with the first team during the previous season. Philipp Wanski was the son of former club president Volkmar Wanski and had a background in the youth department of BFC Dynamo. The average age of the young team was 21.7 years. BFC Dynamo defeated the reserve team of 1. FC Union Berlin 2–1 away on the third matchday, 28 August 2002. The team reached the third round of the 2002–03 Berlin Cup. BFC Dynamo was eventually eliminated after a 1–2 loss to FSV Fortuna Pankow 46 in the third round at the Stadion im Sportforum on 3 November 2002.

Jens Reckmann returned from SG Eintracht Oranienburg for the second half of the season. Reckmann had begun playing football for BFC Dynamo at the age of six. As a 19-year-old, he was part of the team of FC Berlin, under Jürgen Bogs, which just missed promotion to the 2. Bundesliga, against VfL Wolfsburg, in 1992. BFC Dynamo would win the return match against the reserve team of 1. FC Union Berlin 2–1 at home on the 19th matchday, 29 March 2003. The return match was attended by 1,178 spectators at the Stadion im Sportforum. BFC Dynamo started its daycare project in the spring of 2003. The project would later be called "Kita-Projekt". The idea was that small children would be picked up at their preschools and allowed to participate in physical activities in the Sportforum Hohenschönhausen. BFC Dynamo player Michael Dehnert became the first head of the day-care project. Around 300 children from 45 daycare centers in Berlin would come to take part in the project during its first 12 months. BFC Dynamo finished the 2002–03 Verbandsliga Berlin season in third place. Aka Adeck Mba left for Türkiyemspor Berlin and Reckmann for MSV Neuruppin, after the season. Reckmann had played in a total of 246 matches for BFC DYnamo since the  1991-92 season.

Promotion to the Oberliga and end of insolvency (2003–2004)
Jörn Lenz returned from VfB Leipig for the 2003–04 season. Falk Jarling also returned from the reserve team of Hansa Rostock. The team was also joined by midfielder Jörg Schwanke from Dresdner SC and forward Danny Kukulies from SC Pfullendorf. Kukulies had a long background in the youth department of BFC Dynamo. Club members decided to form a new Economic Council at an extraordinary general meeting on 20 June 2003. Dieter Burghaus and Detlef Schlimper, as well as Enrico Schinzel from IG BFC'er, were elected to the Economic Council. The budget for the coming season was about 125,000 Euros. The insolvency situation was complex. The club had about 170 creditors. It was still unclear whether the insolvency proceedings could be successful. Bodo Rudwaleit resigned as an assistant coach on 28 September 2003. He would be replaced by Sven Orbanke. Supporters of BFC Dynamo arranged the first edition of the fan tournament in memory of Mike Polley, in Sportforum Hohenschönhausen, autumn 2003. 28 teams participated in the tournament. BFC Dynamo was in fourth place in the table after the 11th matchday, nine points behind leading SV Tasmania Gropiusstadt 73. However, the goal for the season had been to gain promotion to NOFV-Oberliga Nord. Dirk Vollmark was dismissed and assistant coach Sven Orbanke took over as the new coach. Rajko Fijalek became the new assistant coach. President Peters tried to reach agreements with the last remaining preferential creditors, one of them being Mario Maek, who decided to waive his claim for unpaid salary, in support of the club. Maek was coach of SV Sparta Lichtenberg at the time. BFC Dynamo managed to reach an agreement with the last preferential creditors at the end of November 2003. The club hoped to be able to settle with the 192 creditors for 0.5 percent of their claims.

BFC Dynamo was in third place in the league after the first half of the season. The team was nine points behind leading BFC Preussen and six points behind second-placed SV Tasmania Gropiusstadt 73. The team met SV Tasmania Gropiusstadt 73 on the 18th matchday, 24 January 2004. BFC Dynamo won the match 2–1, with a goal by Jörn Lenz and a goal by Robert Rudwaleit. The team would also win the following matches. Supporters of BFC Dynamo managed to buy back, on eBay for 800 Euros, the lost championship trophy from the 1983-84 DDR-Oberliga. The trophy was handed over to players from the former championship team before the match against BFC Preussen in the quarter-finals of the 2003-04 Berlin Cup on 28 February 2004. BFC Dynamo defeated BFC Preussen 1–0 and reached the semi-finals. The team lost the semi-final against SV Yeşilyurt 1–2 in front of more than 2,000 spectators at the Stadion im Sportforum on 11 May 2004. SV Yeşilyurt had ties to the Turkish community in Berlin. Some supporters of BFC Dynamo had brought about 50 flatbreads to the stadium which they waved and then threw onto the running track as a provocation. The action drew criticism in Turkish media. The president of BFC Dynamo Peters publicly apologized for the action. BFC Dynamo was in first place in the league with six matches left to play. The team was now six points ahead of both SV Tasmania Gropiusstadt 73 and BFC Preussen. The insolvency proceedings now also looked to come to a positive conclusion. BFC Dynamo eventually finished the 2003–04 Verbandsliga Berlin in first place and won promotion to NOFV-Oberliga Nord. The team had won all 17 matches during the second half of the season, which was a new record for the Verbandsliga Berlin. Kukulies became the top goal scorer of the league with 32 goals. Suwary came second with 22 goals. The former professional player of BFC Dynamo Christian Backs became the new coach on 1 June 2004. The insolvency proceedings were concluded after a meeting with the creditors at the Charlottenburg District Court on 8 June 2004. The 192 creditors received an insolvency rate of 0.25 percent from the recognized debts of 1,789 million Euros. The insolvency proceedings were then declared closed by the Charlottenburg District Court on 16 June 2004. The decision was finally confirmed by the Berlin Regional Court at the end of October 2004, after one complaint was dismissed.

See also
 History of Berliner FC Dynamo (1954–1978)
 History of Berliner FC Dynamo (1978–1989)
 History of Berliner FC Dynamo (2004–present)

Explanatory notes

References

Berliner FC Dynamo
History of association football by club
History of football in Germany